Jonathan Gregory is a music producer born in Wick, Caithness, Scotland, on 29 January 1971. Jon produced the 2010 Eurovision entry for Cyprus, "Life Looks Better in Spring", performed by Jon Lilygreen and The Islanders.

References

Scottish record producers
Living people
1971 births
Eurovision Song Contest entrants of 2010
Eurovision Song Contest entrants for Cyprus